Allium hickmanii is a rare species of wild onion known by the common name Hickman's onion. It is endemic to California, where it is known from Monterey, Sonoma, Kern, and San Luis Obispo Counties.

Description
Allium hickmanii grows from a pale brown or gray bulb about a centimeter long and produces a stem up to 17 centimeters tall. There are generally two long, cylindrical leaves which are longer than the stem. The inflorescence holds up to about 15 white or pinkish flowers each less than a centimeter long.

References

External links
 Calflora Database: Allium hickmanii (Hickman's onion)
UC Photos gallery

hickmanii
Endemic flora of California
Natural history of the California chaparral and woodlands
Onions
Plants described in 1903
Taxa named by Alice Eastwood